"A Nation's Will" was the national anthem of the Yemen Arab Republic. The anthem was introduced in 1978 to replace the old national anthem "Peace to the Land".

Lyrics

References

National anthems
Historical national anthems
North Yemen
History of Yemen
1978 songs